Henry Hibbs may refer to:

 Harry Hibbs (footballer) (1906–1984), English football goalkeeper
 Henry C. Hibbs (1882–1949), American architect

See also
Harry Hibbs (disambiguation)